David Bancroft Johnson, Jr. (January 10, 1856 - December 26, 1928) was the founder and first president of the "Winthrop Training School" for white women teachers, now Winthrop University.

Biography
David Bancroft Johnson, Jr. was born on January 10, 1856, in La Grange, Tennessee, to David Bancroft Johnson, Sr. who died the following year.

In 1886, when Winthrop was founded, Johnson was serving as the school superintendent of Columbia, South Carolina, schools.

He died on December 26, 1928, in Rock Hill, South Carolina.

References

External links

1856 births
1928 deaths
People from La Grange, Tennessee
Winthrop University people